(243) Ida I Dactyl is a tiny asteroid moon (1.6 km in diameter) that orbits asteroid 243 Ida. It was imaged by the Galileo spacecraft on August 28, 1993; Dactyl was discovered while examining the delayed image downloads from Galileo on February 17, 1994. It was provisionally designated S/1993 (243) 1. The satellite was named after the mythical creatures called dactyls who lived on Mount Ida according to Greek mythology. 

Dactyl orbits Ida with a period of 1.54 days at an average distance of 108 km, with an inclination of 9° to Ida's equator.

The origins of Dactyl are unclear, but two main hypotheses exist. The first is that Dactyl and Ida formed at the same time, and the second is that Dactyl was knocked loose by a later impact.

Dactyl was the first asteroid moon discovered. Its discovery settled the long debate over the existence of asteroid moons.

See also
List of geological features on 243 Ida and Dactyl

External links
243 Ida and Dactyl from The Nine Planets
Asteroid Ida and Dactyl from Views of the Solar System
IAUC 5948 announcing Dactyl's discovery
IAUC 6082 announcing Dactyl's naming
Ida and Dactyl in false coloring, to reveal surface differences

References

Asteroid satellites
Minor planets visited by spacecraft